Averil Mary Thomas (2 August 1932 – 17 April 1997) was a Welsh soprano.

Career
After studying at the Royal Academy of Music, she established herself in the 1960s as a successful early music performer. She appeared as a soloist as well as a member of the Deller Consort. She was also notable for her work in contemporary music. Peter Maxwell Davies wrote pieces with her voice and dramatic ability in mind.

Notable performances
She gave the first performances of a number of works by Peter Maxwell Davies, accompanied by the Fires of London.
 Revelation and Fall (premiered February 1968, adapted 1980).
 Missa super l'homme armé (premiered February 1968, revised 1971).

She appeared at the Proms between 1962 and 1983 singing music ranging from Baroque to Maxwell Davies.

Selected recordings
 Thomas' vocals appeared on the 1976 ELO track, "Rockaria!", which was released as a single in 1977 and reached the Top Ten in the UK Singles Chart.
 Revelation and Fall (reissued on CD in 2004)

References

1932 births
1997 deaths
Musicians from Swansea
Welsh sopranos
20th-century Welsh women singers